Kaboom! is an action video game published in 1981 by Activision for the Atari VCS (renamed to the Atari 2600 in 1982). It was programmed by Larry Kaplan, and David Crane coded the overlaid sprites. The game was well received and sold over one million cartridges by 1983.

Kaboom! is an unauthorized adaptation of the 1978 Atari, Inc. arcade video game Avalanche. The gameplay of both is fundamentally the same, but Kaboom! was re-themed to be about a mad bomber instead of falling rocks. Ex-Atari programmer Larry Kaplan originally wanted to port Avalanche to the Atari 2600. In Avalanche all the boulders are lined up at the top which is difficult to accomplish on the 2600, so the design was adjusted.

Atari 8-bit family and Atari 5200 ports followed in 1983.

Gameplay 

The game is similar to Avalanche in concept, but instead of there being a pre-existing set of rocks across the top of the screen that randomly fall, a character known as the "Mad Bomber" moves back and forth randomly dropping bombs. As the game progresses, the Mad Bomber traverses the top of the screen more erratically, dropping bombs at increasingly higher speeds, making each of the seven higher levels more difficult.

The player uses a paddle controller to move buckets back and forth near the bottom of the screen to catch the bombs before they reach the bottom. The player starts with multiple buckets arranged over each other, which makes it more likely to catch the bombs in one of them. If the player fails to catch a bomb, it explodes, along with any other bombs still on the screen in a chain reaction from bottom to top. This also causes one of the buckets to disappear. The game ends when the player loses the last one. Points are awarded for every bomb caught, and extra buckets (maximum of three) are awarded at every 1,000 points.

While the Mad Bomber is dropping bombs, he has an unhappy face. If the player misses and a bomb is dropped, he smiles while the bombs on the screen explode. The game manual mentions that something "special" will happen after 10,000 points. When the player reaches that score threshold, the Mad Bomber's mouth opens in surprise even if the player drops a bomb.

When Kaboom! was originally sold, players who scored above 3,000 points could send Activision a photograph of their television screens to receive membership in the Activision Bucket Brigade and a Bucket Brigade patch.

Ports
Kaboom! was later released for the Atari 5200 and the Atari 8-bit family of computers. A 16-bit remake for the Super NES was in the works at some point, but was never released.

Kaboom! is included in the Activision Anthology compilation.

Reception
Contemporary critical reception was positive with Kaboom! winning an award for "Best Audio-Visual Effects" at the 3rd annual Arkie Awards. Arkie Award judges characterized the game as "a feast for the eyes and ears" and commented that Activision had "hit the mark dead-center again with 'Kaboom!'". While the game concept was described as rather similar to that of Avalanche, Kaboom! was found to have such presentational elan that it was hailed as an "instant classic". Richard A. Edwards reviewed Kaboom! in The Space Gamer No. 55 Edwards commented that "All in all, it is hard to recommend Kaboom!  Definitely try this one before buying." Video magazine praised Kaboom! for "exceptional" graphics and "lightning-quick" gameplay. Antic in 1984 said that the Atari 8-bit version had "cute" graphics and was "simple, but not by any means easy". In 1995, Flux magazine ranked the Atari 2600 version 85th on their Top 100 Video Games.  They described the game as "Simple and addictive."

Reviews
Games

Legacy
In the late 1990s, a keychain version of the game was created by Tiger Electronics.

See also

 Lost Luggage, another Atari 2600 Avalanche-inspired game, but with suitcases instead of bombs
 Eggomania, a chicken-and-egg themed Avalanche variant for the 2600
List of Atari 2600 games
List of Activision games: 1980–1999

References

External links
Kaboom! for the Atari 2600 at Atari Mania
Kaboom! for the Atari 8-bit family at Atari Mania

1981 video games
Action video games
Activision games
Atari 2600 games
Atari 5200 games
Atari 8-bit family games
Video games developed in the United States
Multiplayer and single-player video games